Douglas Oldford (born c. 1949) was a Canadian politician. He represented the electoral district of Trinity North in the Newfoundland and Labrador House of Assembly from 1991 to 2000. He was a member of the Liberal Party of Newfoundland and Labrador. Oldford was deputy speaker of the legislature in 2000, when he resigned due to health reasons.

In 2001, he was named to the Historic Sites and Monuments Board of Canada.

References

1940s births
Living people
Liberal Party of Newfoundland and Labrador MHAs
21st-century Canadian politicians